Mbulaeni Tongai Mulaudzi (8 September 1980 – 24 October 2014) was a South African middle distance runner, and the 2009 world champion in the men's 800 metres.

His first global medal was a silver at the 2000 African Championships in Athletics. He later won a bronze at the 2003 World Championships in Athletics, which came a year after his victory at the 2002 Commonwealth Games. Mulaudzi was the gold medallist at the 2004 IAAF World Indoor Championships and won two further silver medals at the competition in 2006 and 2008.  He was runner-up at continental level on three occasions, taking the 800 m silver at the African Championships in Athletics in 2000 and at the All-Africa Games in 2003 and 2007. He carried the flag for his native country at the opening ceremony of the 2004 Summer Olympics, where he became an Olympic silver medallist.

His personal best for the 800 m was 1:42.86 minutes. He ranked first on time in the 2006 and 2007 seasons, becoming the first Black South African to achieve such a feat.

Career
Born in Muduluni, Transvaal Province, he had his first success as a teenager at the 1999 African Junior Athletics Championships, where he won the 800 m title.

His first senior international medal was a silver at the 2000 African Championships in Athletics. He competed at the 2001 World Championships in Athletics and finished sixth in his first global final. At his first Commonwealth Games, Mulaudzi was first past the finish line to become the 2002 Commonwealth champion in the 800 m. He won a bronze medal at the 2003 World Championships the following year, in addition to a silver medal from the 2003 All-Africa Games.

He came to prominence in 2004, when he won at the World Indoor Championships and reached the podium at the 2004 Athens Olympics to win an Olympic silver medal. That year he was inducted into the University of Pretoria Sport Hall of fame.

In the 2006 season he ranked number one in the world for the season – South Africa's first black athlete to do so. He was made South African Sportsman of the Year in recognition of this. At the 2006 World Indoor Championships he won a silver medal, and he repeated the feat two years later at the 2008 edition. He represented South Africa at the 2008 Beijing Olympics but was knocked out of the 800 m at the semi-final stage.

He made the 800 m final at four consecutive World Athletics Championships, and won his first gold medal in the event in 2009. He set a lifetime best of 1:42.86 minutes later that year at the Rieti Meeting. He returned to competition in 2010 with a win at the Meeting Grand Prix IAAF de Dakar.

Death 
Mulaudzi died in a car crash on 24 October 2014 at the age of 34. He was en route to an Athletics South Africa athletics meeting when his car overturned. His death was confirmed by his manager, Peet van Zyl, who said: "Mr Mulaudzi was surely one of the most decorated track athletes that South Africa has ever seen and unfortunately never had the recognition from the federation for all his achievements, so it is indeed a sad day." The President of South Africa, Jacob Zuma, noted his death, saying that he was one of the nation's most talented athletes. Presidential spokesperson Mac Maharaj mirrored this, saying that the nation had lost a hero and that Mulaudzi had flown the South African flag through his athletics. The International Association of Athletics Federations, the governing body for the sport, said it was "deeply saddened" to hear of Mulaudzi's death. The International Olympic Committee expressed sadness and sympathy towards the sports family of South Africa and Mulaudzi's friends and family. South African athletes Caster Semenya and Khotso Mokoena used Twitter to express their emotions following Mulaudzi's death. Semenya said: "Just lost a brother, a friend very good friend! May your soul rest in peace Mbulayeni Mulaudzi! I love you man will always love you Champ!" and Mokoena said: "I've lost a brother, a friend, and a national hero! Sad news to my soul..."

Personal bests
800 metres – 1:42.86 min (2009)
800 metres (indoor) – 1:44.91 min (2008) 
1000 metres – 2:15.86 min (2007) 
1500 metres – 3:38.55 min (2008)

Honours
Mulaudzi was awarded the Order of Ikhamanga (posthumously) in 2015.

Competition record

References

External links

1980 births
2014 deaths
African Games medalists in athletics (track and field)
African Games silver medalists for South Africa
Athletes (track and field) at the 2002 Commonwealth Games
Athletes (track and field) at the 2004 Summer Olympics
Athletes (track and field) at the 2008 Summer Olympics
Commonwealth Games gold medallists for South Africa
Commonwealth Games medallists in athletics
Medalists at the 2004 Summer Olympics
Olympic athletes of South Africa
Olympic silver medalists for South Africa
Olympic silver medalists in athletics (track and field)
People from Makhado Local Municipality
Recipients of the Order of Ikhamanga
Road incident deaths in South Africa
South African male middle-distance runners
University of Pretoria alumni
World Athletics Championships athletes for South Africa
World Athletics Championships medalists
Athletes (track and field) at the 2003 All-Africa Games
Athletes (track and field) at the 2007 All-Africa Games
World Athletics Indoor Championships winners
World Athletics Championships winners
Sportspeople from Limpopo
Medallists at the 2002 Commonwealth Games